The static induction thyristor (SIT, SITh) is a thyristor with a buried gate structure in which the gate electrodes are placed in n-base region. Since they are normally on-state, gate electrodes must be negatively or anode biased to hold off-state. It has low noise, low distortion, high audio frequency power capability. The turn-on and turn-off times are very short, typically 0.25 microseconds.

History
The first static induction thyristor was invented by Japanese engineer Jun-ichi Nishizawa in 1975. It was capable of conducting large currents with a low forward bias and had a small turn-off time. It had a self controlled gate turn-off thyristor that was commercially available through Tokyo Electric Co. (now Toyo Engineering Corporation) in 1988. The initial device consisted of a p+nn+ diode and a buried p+ grid.

In 1999, an analytical model of the SITh was developed for the PSPICE circuit simulator. In 2010, a newer version of SITh was developed by Zhang Caizhen, Wang Yongshun, Liu Chunjuan and Wang Zaixing, the new feature of which was its high forward blocking voltage.

See also
Static induction transistor
MOS composite static induction thyristor

References

External links
Static induction thyristor

Semiconductor devices
Solid state switches
Power electronics